Eagle Bluffs Conservation Area is a nature preserve and wetland in Boone County, Missouri. Located mainly in the Missouri River floodplain southwest of Columbia, Missouri and managed by the Missouri Department of Conservation, the wetlands are a refugee for migrating birds and home to several breeding pairs of bald eagles. The area is named after these eagles and the tall bluffs along the eastern edge of the Missouri River floodplain. Perche Creek flows through the refuge. McBaine, Missouri is located at the north entrance to the area. The Katy Trail State Park traverses the area.

The conservation area was created after the Great Flood of 1993 destroyed farmland. Water for the wetlands is provided by the Missouri River, but also, an innovative system to supply wastewater from the City of Columbia's treatment plant.

See also
Three Creeks Conservation Area
Rock Bridge Memorial State Park

References

External links
Official site
Area map
Friends of Eagle Bluffs Flickr

Conservation Areas of Missouri
Protected areas of Boone County, Missouri
Landforms of Boone County, Missouri